Sareyn (also Romanized as Sar‘eyn, Sara’eyn, Sar‘eīn, Sar ‘Eyn, and Sarein) is a city in the Central District of Sareyn County, Ardabil province, Iran, and serves as capital of the county. At the 2006 census, its population was 4,478 in 1,135 households. The following census in 2011 counted 4,440 people in 1,241 households. The latest census in 2016 showed a population of 5,459 people in 1,582 households.

Sareyn is known for its hot springs. The population increases to more than 20,000 in the summer because of the many tourists who go there due to the charming climate. It stands 25 km from Ardabil and total area is 1.28 square km2.

Sareyn Springs:
 Qara Su (A'saab) Thermal Spring 
 Sari Su Thermal Spring 
 Gavmish Goli Thermal Spring 
 General Thermal Spring 
 Besh Bajilar Thermal Spring 
 Qahveh Suei Thermal Spring 
 Pehenlu Thermal Spring

See also

 Alvares (ski resort)
 Ardabil
 Kandovan
 Tabriz
 Zonuz

References

External links
 Sarein – Iran Tourism center

Sareyn County

Cities in Ardabil Province

Towns and villages in Sareyn County

Populated places in Ardabil Province

Populated places in Sareyn County